Loeiz Herrieu or Louis Henrio (27 January 1879 in Lanester, then in Caudan – 22 May 1953 in Auray) was a Breton historian who wrote in his native language of Breton vannetais. The son of a farmer, he was nicknamed Er Barh Labourér ("the peasant bard").

1879 births
1953 deaths
People from Morbihan
20th-century French historians
Breton historians
French male non-fiction writers
Breton-language writers